Andriana Boyanova (born 13 January 1985) is a Bulgarian footballer who plays as a forward. She has been a member of the Bulgaria women's national team.

References

1985 births
Living people
Women's association football forwards
Bulgarian women's footballers
Bulgaria women's international footballers
FC NSA Sofia players